Ham Green SSSI is a 1.1 hectare geological Site of Special Scientific Interest near the village of Ham Green, North Somerset, notified in 1990.

This is a Geological Conservation Review site.

The site shows a section through red-brown, gritty, stony silts, with abundant Greensand chert Pleistocene sediments. These deposits appear to be heavily cryoturbated terrace gravels of presumed fluvial origin, although a fluvio-glacial origin has also been suggested.

A number of Acheulian handaxes have been found in the area.

References

Sites of Special Scientific Interest in Avon
Sites of Special Scientific Interest notified in 1990